Allen Bentley Pedersen (born January 13, 1965) is a Canadian former professional ice hockey player who played 428 regular season games in the National Hockey League with the Boston Bruins, Minnesota North Stars, and Hartford Whalers.

Pedersen was a dependable, shot blocking, stay-at-home defencemen. He scored a total of 5 goals and 36 assists during his NHL career. He scored 0 points in 64 playoff games, the most games without a point in an NHL playoff career.

Pederson is now hockey director at the Monument Ice Arena in Monument, Colorado.

Career statistics

External links 

1965 births
Living people
Atlanta Knights players
Boston Bruins draft picks
Boston Bruins players
Canadian ice hockey defencemen
Canadian people of Danish descent
Hartford Whalers players
People from Fort Saskatchewan
Maine Mariners players
Medicine Hat Tigers players
Minnesota North Stars players
Moncton Golden Flames players
Springfield Indians players
Ice hockey people from Alberta